Paco de Lucía y Ramón de Algeciras en Hispanoamérica (Paco de Lucía and Ramón de Algeciras in Latin America) is the third of four collaboration albums by Paco de Lucía and his brother Ramón de Algeciras.

Track listing
"Amapola" – 2:55
"Pájaro chogüí" – 2:36
"Yo vendo unos ojos negros” – 2:01
"Guadalajara" – 2:35
"Limeña" – 2:30
"Las mañanitas" – 2:40
"Alma, corazón y vida" – 3:05
"Quizás, Quizás, Quizás" – 3:14
"Tico, tico" – 2:17
"Lamento Borincano" – 2:28
"Y todo a media luz" – 3:00
"La paloma" – 2:17

Musicians
Paco de Lucía – Flamenco guitar
Ramón de Algeciras – Flamenco guitar

References
 Gamboa, Manuel José and Nuñez, Faustino. (2003). Paco de Lucía. Madrid:Universal Music Spain.

1969 albums
Paco de Lucía albums
PolyGram albums
Instrumental albums
Collaborative albums